Bilaspur is an Indian village in the Moga district of Punjab.It lies in the tehsil Nihal Singh Wala. It is a very developed village as compared to other villages in the moga district.

References

Villages in Moga district